Captain George Augustus Graham (6 August 1833 – 21 October 1909) was a British soldier, historian and dog breeder. Graham is best known for reviving the Irish Wolfhound from extinction and establishing the modern breed standard. All present-day Irish Wolfhounds are descended from his wolfhounds, bred between 1874 and 1899.

Early years and family 
Born in the Bathwick district of Bath, Somerset into the Rednock branch of Clan Graham, he was of Scottish descent and educated in Cheltenham. His father was Colonel Charles Graham of Rednock CB, a scion of the Dukes of Montrose, who served in the First Ava War. In 1863 Graham married Lydia Caroline Potter, with whom he had seven children.

India 
In 1852 Graham was commissioned in the East India Company's Bengal Infantry and dispatched to India to serve with the 11th Native Infantry in Barrackpore, north of Calcutta. In October 1854 he was promoted to lieutenant and in March 1857, took part in the Bozdar Expedition under the command of Sir Neville Bowles Chamberlain against the Baloch tribe, which was raiding the Punjab. After this punitive expedition, he was awarded the India General Service Medal. Graham played an important role in the Indian Rebellion of 1857, serving with his regiment during the infamous mutiny, and was promoted to captain – the rank he was later always known by. He was proficient in Hindustani. While in India, Graham had developed a passion for historic sighthounds and was particularly fond of Scottish Deerhounds. He returned to England in 1862 and later the following year, bought the renamed Rednock House, near Dursley, Gloucestershire.

Irish Wolfhound 
The original Irish Wolfhound was declared extinct in the early 19th century by most authors. This was due to the extinction of wolves in Ireland, war, famine and over-exportation abroad. In 1863 Graham travelled to Ireland in order to gather the last remaining wolfhounds and in Kilfane, County Kilkenny, he bought 'Faust', a male wolfhound of unknown pedigree claimed to be of original Irish Wolfhound stock. He attempted to breed using only a select group of true-bred Irish wolfhounds, but with a gene-pool too small this first attempt was unsuccessful. In the following years, Graham persisted and formed the opinion that the Irish Wolfhound could be revived by breeding large Glengarry strain Scottish Deerhounds, which he believed were derived earlier from the wolfhound, with his only true-bred bitch 'Old Donagh' from Ballytobin, County Kilkenny. The Great Dane, also thought to be descended from wolfhounds imported to Europe, was among several breeds Graham reluctantly used to create the modern Irish Wolfhound. In 1885 his results were met with a breed standard, approved and ratified by the Kennel Club. Graham is widely credited as having saved the Irish Wolfhound from extinction and created the modern breed.

References

1833 births
1909 deaths
Dog breeders
British soldiers
British people of Scottish descent
British military personnel of the Indian Rebellion of 1857
People from Dursley